Charles Hawkins may refer to:

 Charles Hawkins (cricketer) (1817–1846), English cricketer
 Charles Edward Hawkins (1802–1837), Commander of the First Texas Navy during the Texan Revolution
 Charles G. Hawkins (1887–1958), Liberal party member of the Senate of Canada
 Charles R. Hawkins (born 1943), former American politician
 Charles Hawkins (Medal of Honor) (1834/1835–1908), American Navy seaman